Waterperry with Thomley is a civil parish in South Oxfordshire. It includes the village of Waterperry (Ordnance Survey grid reference SP626066) and the abandoned former village of Thomley (OS Grid ref. SP629091). Thomley and Wateperry were separate civil parishes in 1957. The current single civil parish was formed at some time thereafter, comprising 13.76 km2, having a population of 257 recorded in the United Kingdom Census 2011.

Sources

References

Civil parishes in Oxfordshire
South Oxfordshire District